Harry Hull may refer to:

 Harry E. Hull (1864–1938), Republican U.S. Representative from Iowa
 Harry Hull (musician), American jazz tubist, see Johnny Dunn

See also
 Henry Hull (1890–1977), American actor